Simon Woods (born 7 January 1980) is an English actor and playwright best known for his role as Octavian in Season 2 of the British-American television series Rome and the 2005 Pride & Prejudice as Charles Bingley.

Personal life
Woods attended Eton College, then read English at Magdalen College, Oxford. While at Oxford, he became friends with Chelsea Clinton. After graduating from Oxford, Woods worked briefly at The Guardian before becoming an actor.

While at Oxford in 2000, he was in a relationship with Rosamund Pike that lasted two years. The two later played lovers Jane Bennet and Charles Bingley in Pride & Prejudice.

Since 2009, Woods has been in a relationship with Christopher Bailey, the former chief executive of the British fashion house, Burberry. They married in 2012. They have two daughters, Iris and Nell.

Filmography

Playwright
Woods's stage play Hansard was presented at the Lyttelton Theatre, London, in September 2019. The work, named after the official record of proceedings in the British parliament, was directed by Simon Godwin.

References

External links

1980 births
20th-century English LGBT people
21st-century English male actors
21st-century English LGBT people
Alumni of Magdalen College, Oxford
English gay actors
English male television actors
Living people
People educated at Eton College
English male dramatists and playwrights
21st-century English dramatists and playwrights
21st-century English male writers
English gay writers
British LGBT dramatists and playwrights